The 2017 Internazionali di Tennis d'Abruzzo will be a professional tennis tournament played on clay courts. It will be the first edition of the tournament which will be part of the 2017 ATP Challenger Tour. It will take place in Francavilla al Mare, Italy between 24 and 30 April 2017.

Point distribution

Singles main-draw entrants

Seeds

 1 Rankings are as of April 17, 2017.

Other entrants
The following players received wildcards into the singles main draw:
  Matteo Berrettini
  Simone Bolelli
  Andrea Pellegrino
  Lorenzo Sonego

The following players received entry from the qualifying draw:
  Omar Giacalone
  Filip Krajinović
  Sebastian Ofner
  Miljan Zekić

Champions

Singles

 Pedro Sousa def.  Alessandro Giannessi 6–3, 7–6(7–3).

Doubles

 Julian Knowle /  Igor Zelenay def.  Rameez Junaid /  Kevin Krawietz 2–6, 6–2, [10–7].

References

Internazionali di Tennis d'Abruzzo
Internazionali di Tennis d'Abruzzo